Louise Pagenkopf (née Louise Elisabeth Wilhelmine Pagenkopf; (3 March 1856 - 30 March 1922)) was a German female landscape and flower painter. She is most known for her watercolor paintings, which have been featured and exhibited in several national and international art expeditions.

Life 
Louise Pagenkopf was born on 3 March 1856 in Fürstenberg/Havel, Germany. She lived in Berlin from 1871. There she studied at The Royal School of Art in Berlin. She was a student of R. Warthemüller, Walter Leistikow and Walter Moras. From 1894 to 1899 she traveled to southern Germany, Paris (1895/96) and French-speaking Switzerland. She was a member of the artists' association in Berlin.

Works 

Pagenkopf's landscape watercolors were featured in contemporary reviews for the lightness of their style.

Literature 
 Grete Grewolls: Who was who in Mecklenburg-Western Pomerania. Edition Temmen, Bremen 1995.
 General lexicon of visual artists from antiquity to the present. Volume 26. Engelmann, Leipzig 1932.
 Spiritual Germany at the end of the 19th century . Volume 1. Röder, Leipzig 1898.

External links 

 Ahnenforschung Pagenkopf
 Literature about Louise Pagenkopf in the Landesbibliographie MV

References 

1856 births
1922 deaths
19th-century German painters
20th-century German painters
Artists from Brandenburg
German landscape painters
19th-century German women artists
20th-century German women artists